was a village located in Oe District, Tokushima Prefecture, Japan.

As of 2003, the village had an estimated population of 1,310 and a density of 25.96 persons per km². The total area was 50.47 km².

On October 1, 2004, Misato, along with the towns of Kamojima, Kawashima and Yamakawa (all from Oe District), was merged to create the new city of Yoshinogawa.

External links
 Yoshinogawa official website 

Dissolved municipalities of Tokushima Prefecture
Yoshinogawa, Tokushima